"Tempête" is a song by French hip hop artist Nekfeu, produced by himself and DJ Elite. It was released on June 1, 2015 as the fourth single from his debut studio album Feu.

The song entered the French Singles Chart at number 21 on June 13, 2015, where it since peaked.

Music video
A music video for the song was published on YouTube on June 1, 2015. It was directed by Felix Perreault, Xavier Menard Carrignant, Philémon Crête and Léa Dumoulin.

Track listing
 Digital download
 "Tempête" – 3:17

Chart performance

References

2015 singles
2015 songs
Nekfeu songs
French-language songs
Seine Zoo singles
Polydor Records singles
Songs written by Nekfeu